Barbara Blackburn may refer to:
Barbara Blackburn (actress)
Barbara Blackburn (dog trainer) (1910–1988), TV personality and author
Barbara Blackburn (typist) (?–2008), American typist and writer, the Guinness World Record holder for the world's fastest typist
Barbara Blackburn, wife of writer Jolly Blackburn and inspiration for the character of Sara in Knights of the Dinner Table